Asahel Smith represented Dedham, Massachusetts in the Great and General Court. He also served three terms as selectman, beginning in 1692.

References

Works cited

Members of the colonial Massachusetts General Court from Dedham
Year of birth missing
Year of death missing
Dedham, Massachusetts selectmen